This is the results breakdown of the local elections held in the Basque Country on 25 May 2003. The following tables show detailed results in the autonomous community's most populous municipalities, sorted alphabetically.

Overall

City control
The following table lists party control in the most populous municipalities, including provincial capitals (shown in bold). Gains for a party are displayed with the cell's background shaded in that party's colour.

Municipalities

Barakaldo
Population: 95,515

Basauri
Population: 45,482

Bilbao
Population: 353,950

Donostia-San Sebastián
Population: 181,700

Errenteria
Population: 38,697

Getxo
Population: 84,024

Irun
Population: 57,618

Portugalete
Population: 51,553

Santurtzi
Population: 47,460

Vitoria-Gasteiz
Population: 221,270

Juntas Generales

References

Basque Country
2003